Portola Valley is a town in San Mateo County, California. Located on the San Francisco Peninsula in the Bay Area, Portola Valley is a small, wealthy community nestled on the eastern slopes of the Santa Cruz Mountains.

History 

Portola Valley was named for Spanish explorer Gaspar de Portolá, who led the first party of Europeans to explore the San Francisco Peninsula in 1769.

The Native Americans already present were Ohlone and specifically the group (or groups) known as Olpen or Guemelento but these were later moved to Mission Dolores and Mission Santa Clara de Asís which claimed the land and peoples. 
The area's written history dates back to 1833, when  a square league of land was given to Domingo Peralta and Máximo Martínez by Governor José Figueroa to form the Rancho Cañada del Corte de Madera. In those days it was used for lumbering and cattle grazing.

By the 1880s Andrew S. Hallidie, a wire rope manufacturer, had built his country home of Eagle Home Farm in what is now Portola Valley.  He built a 7,341 foot long aerial tramway from his house to the top of Skyline in 1894 though it was removed after his death in 1900.

In 1886 the name Portola-Crespi Valley was bestowed on the area from the then community of Crystal Springs (now under Crystal Springs Reservoir to the then community of Searsville (in the area of the present day Jasper Ridge Biological Preserve); Crespi is for Juan Crespí, a Franciscan friar with the Portolà expedition.

The town was  incorporated in 1964. Bill Lane was the first mayor.

Geography
Portola Valley is located on the  San Francisco Peninsula on the eastern slope of the Santa Cruz Mountains.  The town is west of Interstate 280 and the southwest boundary is along Skyline Boulevard which more or less is the ridge of the mountains.  The Windy Hill Open Space Preserve is a large part of the town's southwest side and the north side of the town borders Jasper Ridge Biological Preserve.  Woodside borders it to the northwest and Palo Alto to the southeast  The unincorporated subdivision of Ladera is adjacent to the northern boundary of the town.  It is in a mostly wooded area, with some open fields.  The San Andreas Fault bisects the town.

Alpine Road and Portola Road are the two relatively main roads in the town and their intersection forms a small shopping nexus.

Portola Valley can generally be divided into 7 subdivisions: Central Portola Valley, The Ranch, Corte Madera, Los Trancos/Vista Verde, Woodside Highlands, Westridge, and Blue Oaks.

Attractions 

Our Lady of the Wayside Church was built in 1912 for the local Catholic community and is a California Historic Landmark and on the U.S. National Register of Historic Places.

Portola Valley School is a one-room former school house built in 1909 and is on the U.S. National Register of Historic Places. It is now used for town council meetings.
 
The Alpine Inn, also known as Casa de Tableta, Rossotti's or Zott's, is one of the oldest existing drinking establishments in California; it started around 1852 when Felix Buelna built it as a gambling house. The first two-network TCP/IP transmission was between a specialized SRI van and ARPANET on August 27, 1976; the van was parked next to the Alpine Inn and wires were run to one of the picnic tables. In 2018, the inn was acquired by new owners, who closed it temporarily for remodeling. It was re-opened in August, 2019.

Villa Lauriston, an estate located at 5050 Alpine Road and encompassing almost 29 acres, was initially commissioned by James Graham Fair, the founder of Fairmont Hotels and Resorts.

Trails 
Portola Valley is known for its expansive trail network both maintained by the town and also in the Windy Hill Open Space Preserve maintained by the Midpeninsula Regional Open Space District.  The trail network includes the 235 acre Coal Mine Ridge Nature Preserve which is private property, but, by agreement with the town is set aside as open space.

Demographics

As of 2020 the median income per household in Portola Valley was estimated at $235,469 and the per capita income was $142,778.

2010

The 2010 United States Census reported that Portola Valley had a population of 4,353. The racial makeup of Portola Valley was 3,960 (91.0%) White, 12 (0.3%) African American, 5 (0.1%) Native American, 242 (5.6%) Asian, 1 (0.0%) Pacific Islander, 29 (0.7%) from other races, and 104 (2.4%) from two or more races. Hispanic or Latino of any race were 175 persons (4.0%).

The Census reported that 4,309 people (99.0% of the population) lived in households, 9 (0.2%) lived in non-institutionalized group quarters, and 35 (0.8%) were institutionalized.

There were 1,746 households, out of which 518 (29.7%) had children under the age of 18 living in them, 1,149 (65.8%) were opposite-sex married couples living together, 70 (4.0%) had a female householder with no husband present, 35 (2.0%) had a male householder with no wife present.  There were 37 (2.1%) unmarried opposite-sex partnerships, and 21 (1.2%) same-sex married couples or partnerships. 420 households (24.1%) were made up of individuals, and 290 (16.6%) had someone living alone who was 65 years of age or older. The average household size was 2.47.  There were 1,254 families (71.8% of all households); the average family size was 2.93.

The population was spread out, with 1,001 people (23.0%) under the age of 18, 145 people (3.3%) aged 18 to 24, 538 people (12.4%) aged 25 to 44, 1,496 people (34.4%) aged 45 to 64, and 1,173 people (26.9%) who were 65 years of age or older.  The median age was 51.3 years. For every 100 females, there were 98.4 males.  For every 100 females age 18 and over, there were 91.2 males.

The homeowner vacancy rate was 1.0%; the rental vacancy rate was 9.8%.  3,702 people (85.0% of the population) lived in owner-occupied housing units and 607 people (13.9%) lived in rental housing units.

2000
As of the census of 2000, there were 4,392 people, 1,772 households, and 1,269 families residing in the town. The racial makeup of the town was 4,210 White, 29 African American, 22 Native American, 217 Asian, 5 Pacific Islander, 54 from other races, and 64 from two or more races. Hispanic or Latino of any race were 149.

There were 1,772 households, out of which 532 had children under the age of 18 living with them, 1,176 were married couples living together, 68 had a woman householder with no man present, and 431 were non-families. 339 of all households were made up of individuals, and 226 had someone living alone who was 65 years of age or older.  The average household size was 2.75 and the average family size was 2.93.

In the town the age distribution of the population shows 1021 persons under the age of 18, 90 from 20 to 24, 867 from 25 to 44, 1492 from 45 to 64, and 938 who were 65 years of age or older.  The median age was 47.5 years old. For every 100 women there were 96.8 men.  For every 100 women age 18 and over, there were 91.7 men.

The median income for a household in Portola Valley, including earnings, is $244,771 and the median income for a family was $180,893. Men have a median income of over $200,000 versus $172,585 for women. The per capita income for Portola Valley is $152,128.  About 18 families and 104 people were below the poverty line, including 38 of those under age 18 and none of those age 65 or over.

Education

The Portola Valley Elementary School District has two public primary schools: Ormondale School (with grades K–3) and Corte Madera School (grades 4–8).  The public high school is Woodside High School part of the Sequoia Union High School District and in the neighboring community of Woodside. Ormondale is named for the Ormondale ranch that had covered much of present-day Westridge, Oak Hills, and Ladera and was home to the famous English racehorse, Ormonde, in his later years.

Portola Valley is also home to two private schools: Woodside Priory School, an independent college-preparatory Roman Catholic day and boarding school serving grades 6-12, and Woodland School, an independent pre-K-8 grade school.

The city is served by the Portola Valley Public Library of the San Mateo County Libraries, a member of the Peninsula Library System.

Government

Politically, Portola Valley leans slightly Democratic based on voting patterns for past presidential elections.

Portola Valley is part of the Woodside Fire Protection District (which also covers Woodside, Ladera, Emerald Hills, Los Trancos, Skyline, and Viste Verde), which has one its three stations in the town.

For law enforcement, Portola Valley contracts with the San Mateo County Sheriff's Office.

The Portola Valley Town Council made up of volunteers elected for four year terms governs the town.  It appoints a town manager and other necessary officers and also elects a mayor.

Notable people

John Arrillaga, billionaire businessman and real estate mogul.
Pat Burrell, retired baseball player.
 Curtis Carlson, former CEO of SRI International
Roger Craig, retired pro football player.
Hewitt D. Crane (1927–2008), engineer and inventor who worked at SRI International
Richard Crooks (1900–1972), operatic tenor, longtime host of The Voice of Firestone on network radio who, in later years, sang with the choir at the local Presbyterian church, lived in Portola Valley for many years until his death.
John Donahoe, an American businessman who is the CEO of Nike; He has been the CEO of tech companies like eBay, PayPal and ServiceNow
Donna Dubinsky, CEO of Palm, Inc.
Taylor Eigsti, jazz pianist. From Menlo Park, California, but graduated salutatorian of his high school class at Woodside Priory School.
Dr. Thomas J. Fogarty, surgeon and inventor of the embolectomy catheter.
Tennessee Ernie Ford (1919–1991), singer best known for "Sixteen Tons".
Reid Hoffman, co-founder of LinkedIn.
Cuthbert Hurd (1911–1996), computer pioneer. who discovered a popular variety manzanita in his garden.
Vinod Khosla, a co-founder of Sun Microsystems and current owner of Khosla Ventures.
Laurence W. "Bill" Lane Jr. (1919–2010), the first mayor and one of the founders of Portola Valley, also served as Ambassador to Japan and Australia for the US, and the publisher of Sunset Magazine.
Chong Moon Lee, founder of Diamond Multimedia.
Jacques Littlefield (1949–2009), president and founder of the Military Vehicle Technology Foundation, one of the largest collections of historical military vehicles in the world.
Pete McCloskey, former member of Congress and co-chair of Earth Day. He was also the Town of Portola Valley's first city attorney.
Maverick McNealy, professional golfer, former World No. 1 ranked amateur golfer
Scott McNealy, co-founder of Sun Microsystems
Kent Mitchell, Olympic rowing champion, former mayor of Portola Valley
Ed Oates, a co-founder of Oracle Corporation; currently on the board of the San Francisco Zoological Society, and the San Jose State University Tower Foundation.

References

External links

 Official website
 San Mateo County Library: Portola Valley Public Library branch

 
Cities in San Mateo County, California
Incorporated cities and towns in California
Cities in the San Francisco Bay Area